Lotem Zino (born March 16, 1992) is an Israeli footballer who plays as a midfielder for Hapoel Ashkelon F.C. Lotem is the nephew of Eli Zino, former chairman of Hapoel Be'er Sheva.

Zino made his debut in Hapoel Be'er Sheva against Ironi Nir Ramat HaSharon on September 17, 2011. On 22 March 2012 he scored his first career 94 minutes in 1-2 victory against FC Ashdod.

On July 3, 2014 he moved to FC Thun, but 8 days later tore the ligament and would be gone for six months.

On 7 January 2016, he joined Hapoel Tel Aviv on loan for six month.

Statistics
As July 22, 2014

References

External links

1992 births
Israeli Jews
Living people
Israeli footballers
Hapoel Be'er Sheva F.C. players
FC Thun players
Hapoel Tel Aviv F.C. players
Maccabi Petah Tikva F.C. players
Hapoel Acre F.C. players
Hapoel Ashkelon F.C. players
Israel under-21 international footballers
Israeli Premier League players
Swiss Super League players
Liga Leumit players
Expatriate footballers in Switzerland
Israeli expatriate sportspeople in Switzerland
Footballers from Beersheba
Association football midfielders